The Curse of Caste is a 1914 short drama film directed by Reginald Barker and featuring Sessue Hayakawa, Tsuru Aoki and Thomas Kurihara in important roles.

References

External links 

 

1914 films
Silent American drama films
Films directed by Reginald Barker
American black-and-white films
1914 short films
1914 drama films
American silent short films
1910s American films